Southeast Texas is a cultural and geographic region in the U.S. state of Texas, bordering Southwest Louisiana and its greater Acadiana region to the east. Being a part of East Texas, the region is geographically centered on the Greater Houston and Beaumont–Port Arthur metropolitan statistical areas with a combined population of 7,662,325 according to the 2020 U.S. census.

Geography 
Southeast Texas includes part of the coast of the Gulf of Mexico and most of the Texas portion of the Intracoastal Waterway. The area is also crossed by numerous rivers and streams, the largest three being the Sabine River, the Neches River, and the Trinity River.

In Southeast Texas and the rest of the Southern United States, small rivers and creeks collect into swamps called "bayous" and merge with the surrounding forest. The only large bodies of water in Southeast Texas are Galveston Bay and Sabine Lake, but the large reservoirs of the remainder of East Texas are just to the north. The eastern portion of Southeast Texas is geographically and culturally attached to Southwest Louisiana, though western, southern and northern areas maintain their own distinct Texan cultural identities.

Near the coast, the land is low and extremely flat, and often marshy. The Piney Woods extend into the northern parts of Southeast Texas, reaching as far south as the rice paddies and marshlands that lie between Houston and Beaumont. The highest point on the coast is at High Island, where a salt dome raises the elevation to around 40feet (12m) above sea level.

Away from the coast, the terrain begins to exhibit the rolling hills of Northeast and Central Texas. Toward Central Texas, the mixed pine and hardwood forests give way to the East Central Texas forests of post oak and grasslands.

Golden Triangle 

The Golden Triangle is an area of extreme Southeast Texas near the Louisiana border. The "triangle" is formed by Beaumont, Port Arthur, and Orange, which are the largest cities in the area. "Golden" refers to the wealth that came from the Spindletop oil strike near Beaumont in 1901. In an attempt to distance the area from the petrochemical industry, some area interests attempted to rename the Golden Triangle as the "Triplex." This name change did not catch on, and local residents still refer to it as the Golden Triangle. Some residents of the Golden Triangle do not consider the Greater Houston area to be part of Southeast Texas and place the western boundary of the region approximately at the Trinity River, which is roughly 30 miles from downtown Houston.

This area holds the annual South Texas State Fair in Beaumont.

Big Thicket
The Big Thicket is an area of dense forest located in the area just north and northwest of the city of Beaumont. There are many small towns in this area, including Woodville and Kountze.

The Big Thicket National Preserve protects part of the old thicket, highlighting the area's biological resources. The 97,000 acre (390 km²) preserve boasts a varied ecology of piney woods, swamps, and coastal prairies. It includes extremely diverse range of plant species including orchids, cactus, cypress, and pine in close proximity to each other. Approximately 65,000 people visit this area each year.

Two historically important routes cross the Big Thicket: to the north lies the old cattle route or Beef Trail, that ran from Tyler County to Louisiana; to the south is the Spanish Trail or the Atascosito Road, that parallels modern Highway90 and Interstate10 from Liberty to Orange.

Galveston Bay 

Galveston Bay is a large estuary located along Texas upper coast. The bay is fed by the Trinity River and the San Jacinto River, numerous local bayous, and incoming tides from the Gulf of Mexico. The bay covers approximately 600 square miles (1,500 km²), and is 30 miles (50 km) long and 17 miles (27 km) wide. Galveston Bay is on average 7–9feet (2-3m) deep. The bay has three inlets to the Gulf of Mexico: Bolivar Roads (the exit of the Houston Ship Channel) between Galveston Island and the Bolivar Peninsula, San Luis Pass to the west, and Rollover Pass to the east.

The Houston Ship Channel, connecting the Port of Houston to the Gulf, passes through Galveston Bay. Houston is the largest city on the bay, while smaller ones include Galveston, Pasadena, Baytown, and Texas City. The bay provides nursery and spawning grounds for large amounts of marine life and is important for both commercial and recreational fishing.

Climate 

Compared to the rest of the state, Southeast Texas' climate is warmer in winter and cooler in summer. On average, the region receives more rain than other parts of the state, and it experiences a wet season and dry season like the tropics. This can increase the humidity level in the region. The relatively mild and wet climate is largely due to the influence of the Gulf of Mexico. 

The Southeast Texas region can be comparable to that of Southern Louisiana in climate. Average annual rainfall in the Golden Triangle is 60 inches (1,500 mm). Rainfall totals in other parts of Southeast Texas are lower, but still in excess of 40inches (1,000 mm) per year. During Tropical Storm Claudette in 1979, the city of Alvin recorded an official 24-hour rainfall total of 42inches (1,067 mm)—the highest one-day rainfall total ever measured in the United States. Nederland received 66 inches during Harvey. 

Houston has been called the "Lightning Capital of Texas", as its density of lightning strikes is higher than it is in other parts of the state. This area of unusually high lightning activity stretches from Houston eastward into Southwest Louisiana. Much of this can be explained by the natural occurrence of thunderstorms in the region, which form almost daily during the wet season. However, the unusual clustering of lightning around the developed areas of Houston, the Golden Triangle, and Lake Charles, Louisiana have led many researchers to believe that some combination of urban heat islands and air pollution are responsible for increasing the number of lightning strikes beyond even the already-high natural levels. 

Southeast Texas is vulnerable to hurricanes. Major hurricanes that have severely affected the area in the 21st century include Hurricane Rita in 2005; Hurricane Ike, which passed over much of Houston and surrounding areas in 2008; and Hurricane Harvey, which inundated Southeast Texas in 2017. Weaker storms strike the area routinely. Some, like Tropical Storm Allison and Tropical Storm Claudette, have caused considerable damage.

Culture

The culture of Southeast Texas is closer to Acadiana in Louisiana or the Gulf Coast of Mississippi, than it is to West Texas; among some of its population, Cajun and Creole identity has been preserved. Much of contemporary Southeast Texas has its roots in traditions that go back generations; the region is consistent with much of northern and eastern Texas in that it is part of the Bible Belt—an area in which many inhabitants have strongly traditional Protestant Christian beliefs. Additionally, the Catholic Church in the United States has remained a prominent religious influence since Spanish colonization and missionary work. Among its largest cities in East Texas outside Houston, many still follow a rural Southern way of life, especially in dialect, mannerisms, and cuisine.

Economy 

In the urban areas of Southeast Texas, energy, healthcare, manufacturing and technology are prominent industries. Houston is the largest city and economic center of Southeast Texas, and it holds the third most Fortune 500 headquarters by concentration in the U.S. as of 2021. Major corporations in the region include APA Corporation, Chevron Corporation, HostGator, Jason's Deli, JPMorgan Chase, and Sysco. Outside of the cities, agriculture, tourism and small business have always been major factors in the economy.

Higher education 

The University of Houston System is the largest and most prominent university system based in Southeast Texas, although Texas Southern University, Prairie View A&M University, the University of Saint Thomas, Houston Baptist University, and others are also notable subjects to the region's undergraduate and postgraduate systems. Rice University in Houston was ranked 15th in the nation by U.S. News & World Report as of 2022. In areas closer to Beaumont, Lamar University within the Texas State University System is the center of higher education.

Among the many higher education bodies of Southeast Texas, the University of Houston has contributed an over $6.4 billion economic impact to the region, and $7.7 billion to the state. Its most prominent institutions have been its energy and health colleges, while the historically black college and university of Texas Southern has made an economic impact of $530 million according to data from 2014.

Sports 
Within Southeast Texas, the city of Houston and its metropolitan area has a rich sporting culture and area residents are active in many spectator and participant sports. Spectators attend events including teams from four major professional sports teams and collegiate sports; Beaumont is also the second principal location for collegiate sports. Participants enjoy activities from running in Memorial Park to sailing on Galveston Bay and Clear Lake. A number of other sports are also available, including nearly a dozen fencing clubs, ranging from recreational clubs to elite competitive organizations.

Major league

Collegiate

Transportation 

There are a variety of highways stretching between the Greater Houston and Beaumont metropolitan areas, connecting the communities to the remainder of the Gulf Coast region of the United States, and the Texas Triangle. Among other modes of transportation, the largest airports operating in Southeast Texas are all stationed in the city of Houston.

References

External links 

 Texas Heritage Society

Louisiana Creole culture in Texas
 Regions of Texas